Molly Maud Kiely (born October 10, 1969) is a Canadian-American alternative cartoonist best known for erotica. Her work is published by Fantagraphics/Eros Comix and has influenced other artists such as Jess Fink.

Kiely was born in Bracebridge, Ontario, raised in Kitchener, and attended the University of Waterloo. She has liked drawing her whole life, and discovered comics through Krazy Kat and Li'l Abner. She created her first minicomic in 1991 at the San Diego Comic-Con. She left Canada for San Francisco in 1992.

Her first comic, Communion, was a collaboration with J. Hagey based on a stream-of-consciousness poem about a one-night stand. It was published by the Eros Comix imprint of Fantagraphics in 1992. In 1993, Wooley Comics commissioned her to do a comic adaptation of Marquis de Sade's novel Philosophy in the Bedroom.

She describes her work as "clean line style" that has been compared to Aubrey Beardsley and Jaime Hernandez.

The pornographic nature of her work sometimes draws judgement from feminists who see her as helping men exploit women. Under Subsection 163 of the Canadian Criminal Code, the Canadian Customs and Post Office occasionally confiscated Kiely's work when it was being mailed between her and Eros in 1995.

She had a daughter with her husband in 2007 before being widowed in 2015. As of 2017, Kiely resides in Tucson, Arizona with her daughter.

Selected bibliography
 Communion, 1992 (written by Jonathan Hagey)
 Philosophy in the Bedroom, 1993
 Diary of a Dominatrix, 3 volumes, 1994–1995
 Sass, 1995
 Saucy Little Tart, 5 volumes, 1995–1997
 That Kind of Girl, 1999
 Tecopa Jane, 2000
 On Your Knees Boy, 2002
 Adaptation of Murasaki Shikibu's The Tale of Genji in the anthology The Graphic Cannon, edited by Russ Kick

References

External links
 
 

1969 births
American female comics artists
Canadian female comics artists
American erotic artists
Canadian erotic artists
Living people
People from Bracebridge, Ontario